Rosalyn Warner (1961 in Harwich, Essex – 4 July 2010 in Sunderland), better known as Mad Cow-Girl, was a British nurse who contested several elections as a candidate for the Official Monster Raving Loony Party. She ran for election to the House of Commons for the Haltemprice and Howden seat in 2008 against incumbent Conservative MP David Davis, where she polled 412 votes (a vote that David Davis won comfortably).

Background
Warner's involvement with the OMRLP began in 1997 when she met Screaming Lord Sutch and she subsequently stood as a candidate in both local and general elections from 2004 to 2008. She also stood for election under the name The Mad Cow-Girl Warner. Mad Cow-Girl held numerous positions within the Monster Raving Loony Party, including Party Secretary, Campaigns Officer, Party Archivist and Shadow Minister for around the world in Eighty Days. She stood at the 2001 and 2005 General Elections for the party, in the first constituency to declare – Sunderland South. According to one journalist: "she triumphantly succeeded in maintaining the party's fine tradition of making an absolute mockery of the proceedings, spoiling the perfect picture of democracy at its noblest moment".
In 2005 she appeared in national newspapers alongside then Prime Minister Tony Blair during the Sedgefield count. In 2006 she stood successfully for the board of a Hendon regeneration project, beating a British National Party candidate. Originally from Essex, she lived in Wearside for 10 years, and worked as an intensive care nurse at Sunderland Royal Hospital.
{{quote|After a two-week visit to a friend in Sunderland I quickly decided that the friendliness and hospitality of the people up in the North East of England was my kind of society. The north-south divide does exist in my opinion – the north being a much more pleasant place to live.|sign=Mad Cow-Girl|source=Quoted by the Sunderland Echo, 19 June 2008.}}

Haltemprice and Howden byelection, 2008 candidacy

Warner was one of 26 candidates standing in the 2008 Haltemprice and Howden by-election for the seat of Conservative MP David Davis. In a statement made to the media she stated on the issue of detaining terrorist suspects for 42 days: "I may be a Loony, but I'm not mad enough to want dangerous people walking free in the name of political correctness." Warner argued for the extension of the time-limit for which terrorist suspects can be detained without charge and also argued against civil libertarians who opposed the 42-day limit. She is standing on an indefinite-detention platform, combined with a quote based on Douglas Adams's "Hitchhikers Guide to the Galaxy": "The answer is 42!!! Now we just need to figure out the real question!!!"

Warner positioned herself as tough on terrorism in the run up to the by-election in order to appeal to the voters of the predominantly conservative seat. In one interview she asked: "Why don't decent citizens have a 'human right' not be assaulted, blown up or harassed, when the criminals can scream human rights if their handcuffs hurt?"

The high-profile nature of the by election has led to Warner's candidature being announced on several news sites. The Daily Record consider the fact that only Warner and possibly one other candidate will stand means that the by-election has descended into a farce. The Daily Record have endorsed Warner's candidacy on this account:The Independent'' suggested that Warner was chosen as the candidate because another candidate Banana Man would be contesting the Henley By-Election as a result of Boris Johnson resigning his Henley seat on becoming Mayor of London.

Electoral history

Haltemprice and Howden

2006 council elections

2005 general election

2001 general election
Warner gained 291 votes or 0.9% of the total turnout.

2000 council elections

See also
 Sunderland South (UK Parliament constituency)
 Official Monster Raving Loony Party

References

External links
 Warner's official website

1961 births
2010 deaths
English nurses
Official Monster Raving Loony Party politicians
People from Harwich
British political candidates